Bni Chiker  (Tarifit: Bni Cikaa, ⴱⵏⵉ ⵛⵉⴽⴰⴰ; Arabic:  بني شيكر) is a town in Nador Province, Morocco. At the time of the 2014 census, it had a population of 21,715.

A large proportion of the population is Berber.

It is the birthplace of the writer Mohammed Chukri (1935-2003) and of Najat Vallaud-Belkacem, who on 16 May 2012 was appointed Minister of Women's Rights and Government spokesperson in the Ayrault government in France.

Bni Chiker is known largely for its tourist hotspots such as parts of the mountain of Gourougou

References

Populated places in Nador Province